Monica Augustine “Mona” Minahan, also known as Mona Haines, was an Australian entrepreneur. She lived in Alice Springs as a pioneer of the Northern Territory's hotel industry, building the Riverside Hotel, the town's largest hotel to that point. She became a leading figure in the town's business, social and sporting life, and was made a Member of the Order of the British Empire in 1980.

Career 
Minahan arrived in Alice Springs in 1932 to work as a barmaid at the Sturt Arms Hotel. She later became a businesswoman in the hotel industry. By 1954, she rose to prominence, becoming "one of Central Australia’s best-known identities."

In 1954 she finished the building of the largest hotel in Alice Springs, designed by Northern Territory architect and personality Beni Burnett.

Later life 
Minahan was made a Member of the Order of the British Empire (MBE) in 1980. The Minahan Medal, an annual award for the best and fairest player in the Central Australian Football League (CAFL), was donated by Minahan in 1947.

References 

1898 births
1996 deaths